Ljubinka Nikolić (born 1964) is a Serbian geologist and geographer who was selected to be part of the Mars One project. She, along with 99 other contenders, has been shortlisted to be one of the first humans to land on Mars. She believes that "The Red planet will be the next home for humanity".

Originally from Belgrade, Nikolić has a bachelor's degree in geological engineering from the University of Belgrade. She also has a master's in geography from New York's Hunter College and another master's in interior decoration, which she obtained from the Florence Design Academy in Italy.

References

1964 births
University of Belgrade alumni
Hunter College alumni
Serbian geographers
Serbian geologists
Serbian designers
Living people
Women geologists
Women geographers
Scientists from Belgrade
Mars One